On 10 May 1929 Bechara El Khoury headed the government of Lebanon for the third time. Formed of 3 ministers, the cabinet won the confidence of the parliament with a majority of 28 votes, and supervised 1929 general election.

Composition

References 

Cabinets established in 1929
Cabinets disestablished in 1929
Cabinets of Lebanon